Keith Arnold Hitchins (April 2, 1931 – November 1, 2020) was an American historian and a professor of Eastern European history at the University of Illinois at Urbana-Champaign, specializing in Romania and its history.

He was born in Schenectady, New York. After graduating from Union College, he went to Harvard University, earning a Ph.D. in history in 1964 under the direction of Robert Lee Wolff. After teaching for seven years at Wake Forest University and then for a short period at Rice University, he joined the faculty at the University of Illinois, where he spent the rest of his academic career.

Hitchins wrote or edited more than 20 books, most related to Romania. An honorary member of the Romanian Academy since 1991, he was awarded the National Order of Merit by Romanian President Klaus Iohannis.

Hitchins died on November 1, 2020, at age 89, in the Carle Foundation Hospital in Urbana, Illinois. After his death, Romanian Minister of Foreign Affairs Bogdan Aurescu wrote on Twitter:



Publications

See also
 List of members of the Romanian Academy

References

External links
Obituary of Keith Hitchins
 

1931 births
2020 deaths
People from Schenectady, New York
Historians from New York (state)
20th-century American historians
American male non-fiction writers
21st-century American historians
21st-century American male writers
Honorary members of the Romanian Academy
Recipients of the National Order of Merit (Romania)
University of Illinois Urbana-Champaign faculty
Union College (New York) alumni
Harvard University alumni
Wake Forest University faculty
Rice University faculty
20th-century American male writers